Edward Kay may refer to:

Edward Kay (writer), Canadian writer
Edward J. Kay (1898–1973), American film composer
Edward Ebenezer Kay (1822–1897), British jurist